Pralayam is a 1980 Indian Malayalam-language film,  directed by P. Chandrakumar and produced by T. K. Balachandran. The film stars Prem Nazir, Jayabharathi, Sukumaran and Sankaradi. The film's score was composed by A. T. Ummer.

Cast

Soundtrack
The music was composed by A. T. Ummer with lyrics by Sathyan Anthikkad.

References

External links
 

1980 films
1980s Malayalam-language films
Films directed by P. Chandrakumar